John Rider may refer to:
 John Rider (bishop) (1562–1632), scholar and Anglican Bishop of Killaloe
 John Rider (Alex Rider), a character in Anthony Horowitz's Alex Rider books
 John Francis Rider (engineer) (1900–1985), instructional writer of vacuum tube radio repair
 John Francis Rider (philatelist) (1900–1985), American philatelist

See also
 John Rider House, a historic building in Danbury, Connecticut
 John Ryder (disambiguation)